Statistics of Veikkausliiga in the 1994 season.

Overview
It was contested by 14 teams, and TPV Tampere won the championship.

League standings

Results

See also
Ykkönen (Tier 2)

References
Finland - List of final tables (RSSSF)

Veikkausliiga seasons
Fin
Fin
1